Kew tram depot is located on the corner of Barkers Road and High Street, Kew, a suburb of Melbourne, Australia. Operated by Yarra Trams, it is one of eight tram depots on the Melbourne tram network.

History
Kew tram depot opened on 8 May 1915. When the Public Transport Corporation was privatised in August 1999, Kew depot passed to Yarra Trams.

Layout
The main yard has 12 covered roads. There are two tracks for trams leaving or entering via Barkers Road, and a single track connecting to High Street.

Rolling stock
As at December 2019, the depot had an allocation of 62 trams: 26 A2 Class and 36 C Class.

Routes
The following routes are operated from Kew depot:
48: Victoria Harbour Docklands to Balwyn North
78: North Richmond to Balaclava
109: Box Hill to Port Melbourne

References

Tram depots in Melbourne
Transport infrastructure completed in 1915
1915 establishments in Australia
Transport in the City of Boroondara
Buildings and structures in the City of Boroondara